Psilanthele is a genus of plants in the family Acanthaceae, subfamily Acanthoideae, tribe Justicieae. The genus contains only one species, Psilanthele eggersii, native to Ecuador. Its habitat is coastal forest up to an elevation of 530 m. It assessed in 2003 as "critically endangered".

References

Acanthaceae
Acanthaceae genera
Taxonomy articles created by Polbot
Monotypic Lamiales genera